The 2018 TCU Horned Frogs baseball team represented Texas Christian University during the 2018 NCAA Division I baseball season. The Horned Frogs played their home games at Charlie & Marie Lupton Baseball Stadium as a member of the Big 12 Conference. They were led by head coach Jim Schlossnagle, the winningest coach in TCU baseball history, in his 15th year at TCU.

Previous season
The Horned Frogs entered the 2018 season on the heels of four consecutive trips to the College World Series. The 2017 TCU Horned Frogs baseball team entered the season as the unanimous preseason #1 team, and the favorite to win the Big 12 regular season championship. They notched a 39–14 (16–8) regular season record, and won a Big 12 Conference championship for the fourth-straight season, sharing the regular season co-championship with Texas Tech. In the postseason, the Horned Frogs advanced to the Big 12 Tournament semifinals, before being eliminated by Texas. TCU was selected as the #6 National Seed the NCAA Tournament, the Horned Frogs' highest-ever national seed.  Star-first baseman/designated hitter Luken Baker was unavailable for the Tournament after a late-regular season injury. The Frogs coasted to a 3–0 record in the Fort Worth Regional, with wins over Central Connecticut, #11 Virginia, and #20 Dallas Baptist, and a 2–0 sweep of #8 Missouri State in the Fort Worth Super Regional to advance to the College World Series for the fourth-straight year. In Omaha, the Frogs fell in their opener to eventual-national champion, Florida, an 0–3 loss at the hands of Gator starting pitcher Alex Faedo. TCU then eliminated #8 Texas A&M and #4 Louisville to advance to a rematch with Florida in the national semifinals. The Frogs' win over the Aggies marked the third consecutive season, and the fourth in the past six seasons, that TCU eliminated Texas A&M from the NCAA tournament. The Frogs then beat #3 Florida 9–2 in the teams' first rematch before falling to the Gators in a decisive national semifinal game, again an 0–3 loss to Alex Faedo. The loss marked the third-straight year that TCU's season ended in the national semifinals. TCU finished the season ranked #4 in every final poll, with a 50–18 record (the Frogs' third 50-win season).

Preseason

MLB draft 
The following Horned Frogs on the 2016 roster were selected in the 2017 Major League Baseball draft:

* indicates draftee had no more college eligibility

Departed Players
The following Horned Frogs on the 2017 roster departed the program prior to the 2018 season:

Recruiting Class
The Horned Frogs added the following players to the roster as part of their 2017 recruiting class:

Season Projections
Coming off four-straight College World Series appearances in 2014, 2015, 2016, and 2017, returning anticipated starting pitchers Jared Janczak, Rex Hill and Nick Lodolo, and adding a highly ranked recruiting class, the 2018 Horned Frogs were projected as one of the "Eight for Omaha" in July 2017 by Baseball America, D1 Baseball, and Perfect Game.

The Horned Frogs were ranked in each major preseason poll and ranking. TCU was ranked #3 by Perfect Game, #4 in the USA Today Coaches Poll, #5 in the NCBWA Poll, #7 by D1 Baseball and Baseball America, and #9 by Collegiate Baseball.

Big 12 coaches predicted TCU would finish second in league play, with 4 of the 9 coaches picking TCU to finish in first place.

Personnel

Coaching staff
TCU will return its entire coaching staff from the Frogs' 2014, 2015, 2016, and 2017 College World Series seasons. Pitching coach Kirk Saarloos, a California native, was reportedly courted by Stanford to replace 31-season head coach Mark Marquess, but Saarloos opted to remain at TCU.

Roster
The Horned Frogs' 2018 roster consists of 17 returners and 15 new players. Nearly half of the roster (15 of 32 players) are from outside the State of Texas. Sophomore catcher Zach Humphreys and freshman pitcher Russell Smith were high school teammates at Midlothian High School, and sophomore pitcher Cal Coughlin and freshman outfielder Brad Czerniejewski were high school teammates at Lake Forest High School in Illinois. Junior catcher Colton Parrish and junior outfielder Johnny Rizer were teammates at Blinn College before transferring to TCU prior to the 2018 season.

Schedule and results

! style="background:#4d1979;color:white;"| Regular Season
|- valign="top" 

|- bgcolor="#bbffbb"
| February 16 || 7:00 pm || ESPN3 || at * || #9 || Brazell Stadium • Phoenix, AZ || W3–2 || Coughlin{1–0) || Vorhof(0–1) || Feltman(1) || 3,479 || 1–0 || – || StatsStory
|- bgcolor="#bbffbb"
| February 17 || 3:00 pm ||  || at Grand Canyon* || #9 || Brazell Stadium • Phoenix, AZ || W14–6 || Lodolo(1–0) || Lundin(0–1) || – || 2,012 || 2–0 || – || StatsStory
|- bgcolor="#ffbbbb"
| February 18 || 2:00 pm ||  || at Grand Canyon* || #9 || Brazell Stadium • Phoenix, AZ || L8–912 || Smith(1–0) || King(0–1) || – || 1,934 || 2–1 || – || StatsStory
|- bgcolor="#ffbbbb"
| February 24 || 2:00 pm ||  || * || #9 || Lupton Stadium • Fort Worth, TX || L2–3 || Baayoun (2–0) || Janczak(0–1) || Rivera(2) || 4,120 || 2–2 || – || StatsStory
|- bgcolor="#bbffbb"
| February 24 || 5:30 pm ||  || Long Beach State* || #9 || Lupton Stadium • Fort Worth, TX || W8–3 || Lodolo(2–0) || Castro(0–1) || Notary(1) || 4,005 || 3–2 || – || StatsStory
|- bgcolor="#bbffbb"
| February 25 || 1:00 pm || FSSW || Long Beach State* || #9 || Lupton Stadium • Fort Worth, TX || W5–2 || Green(1–0) || Andrews(0–2) || Feltman(2) || 4,343 || 4–2 || – || StatsStory
|-

|- bgcolor="#bbffbb"
| March 1 || 6:30 pm ||  || * || #12 || Lupton Stadium • Fort Worth, TX || W14–17 || Smith(1–0) || Moffat(0–2) || – || 4,013 || 5–2 || – || StatsStory
|- bgcolor="#bbffbb"
| March 2 || 6:30 pm || || * || #12 || Lupton Stadium • Fort Worth, TX || W4–3 || Eissler(1–0) || Bocko(0–1) || – || 4,639 || 6–2 || – || StatsStory
|- bgcolor="#bbffbb"
| March 3 || 2:00 pm || || UC Irvine* || #12 || Lupton Stadium • Fort Worth, TX || W6–2 || Lodolo(3–0) || Raymond(1–1) || – || 4,736 || 7–2 || – || StatsStory
|- bgcolor="#ffbbbb"
| March 4 || 1:00 pm || FSSW || UC Irvine* || #12 || Lupton Stadium • Fort Worth, TX || L2–15 || Denholm(1–1) || Smith(1–1) || – || 4,063 || 7–3 || – || StatsStory
|- bgcolor="#bbffbb"
| March 6 || 6:30 pm || || * || #14 || Lupton Stadium • Fort Worth, TX || W7–2 || Eissler(2–0) || Carreon(0–1) || – || 4,021 || 8–3 || – || StatsStory
|- bgcolor="#bbffbb"
| March 9 || 8:00 pm || || at * || #14 || Dedeaux Field • Los Angeles, CA || W10–1 || Janczak(1–1) || Clarke(1–3) || – || 1,105 || 9–3 || – || StatsStory
|- bgcolor="#ffbbbb"
| March 11 || 12:30 pm || || vs #10 * || #14 || Dodger Stadium • Los Angeles, CA || L4–7 ||  ||  ||  ||  || 9–4 || – || 
|- align="center" bgcolor=""
| March 13 || 6:30 pm || || at * ||  || Reckling Park • Houston, TX ||  ||  ||  ||  ||  ||  || – || 
|- align="center" bgcolor=""
| March 16 || 6:30 pm || || * ||  || Lupton Stadium • Fort Worth, TX ||  ||  ||  ||  ||  ||  || – || 
|- align="center" bgcolor=""
| March 17 || 5:00 pm || || Minnesota* ||  || Lupton Stadium • Fort Worth, TX ||  ||  ||  ||  ||  ||  || – || 
|- align="center" bgcolor=""
| March 18 || 12:30 pm || FSSW+ || Minnesota* ||  || Lupton Stadium • Fort Worth, TX ||  ||  ||  ||  ||  ||  || – || 
|- align="center" bgcolor=""
| March 20 || 6:30 pm || || * ||  || Lupton Stadium • Fort Worth, TX ||  ||  ||  ||  ||  ||  || – || 
|- align="center" bgcolor=""
| March 23 || 6:30 pm || ||  ||  || Lupton Stadium • Fort Worth, TX ||  ||  ||  ||  ||  ||  ||  || 
|- align="center" bgcolor=""
| March 24 || 2:00 pm || FSSW || Kansas State ||  || Lupton Stadium • Fort Worth, TX ||  ||  ||  ||  ||  ||  ||  || 
|- align="center" bgcolor=""
| March 25 || 1:00 pm || FSSW+ || Kansas State ||  || Lupton Stadium • Fort Worth, TX ||  ||  ||  ||  ||  ||  ||  || 
|- align="center" bgcolor=""
| March 27 || 6:30 pm || || * ||  || Lupton Stadium • Fort Worth, TX ||  ||  ||  ||  ||  ||  || – || 
|- align="center" bgcolor=""
| March 30 || 8:00 pm || ESPNU || at  ||  || Allie P. Reynolds Stadium • Stillwater, OK ||  ||  ||  ||  ||  ||  ||  || 
|- align="center" bgcolor=""
| March 31 || 6:00 pm || ESPNU || at Oklahoma State ||  || Allie P. Reynolds Stadium • Stillwater, OK ||  ||  ||  ||  ||  ||  ||  || 
|-

|- align="center" bgcolor=""
| April 1 || 12:00 pm || FSSW || at Oklahoma State ||  || Allie P. Reynolds Stadium • Stillwater, OK ||  ||  ||  ||  ||  ||  ||  || 
|- align="center" bgcolor=""
| April 3 || 6:30 pm || || at Dallas Baptist* ||  || Horner Ballpark • Dallas, TX ||  ||  ||  ||  ||  ||  || – || 
|- align="center" bgcolor=""
| April 6 || 6:30 pm || ||  ||  || Lupton Stadium • Fort Worth, TX ||  ||  ||  ||  ||  ||  ||  || 
|- align="center" bgcolor=""
| April 7 || 7:00 pm || ESPNU || Oklahoma ||  || Lupton Stadium • Fort Worth, TX ||  ||  ||  ||  ||  ||  ||  || 
|- align="center" bgcolor=""
| April 8 || 1:00 pm || || Oklahoma ||  || Lupton Stadium • Fort Worth, TX ||  ||  ||  ||  ||  ||  ||  || 
|- align="center" bgcolor=""
| April 10 || 6:30 pm ||  || Texas–Arlington* ||  || Lupton Stadium • Fort Worth, TX ||  ||  ||  ||  ||  ||  || – || 
|- align="center" bgcolor=""
| April 13 || 6:00 pm || ESPN3 || at  ||  || Hoglund Ballpark • Lawrence, KS ||  ||  ||  ||  ||  ||  ||  || 
|- align="center" bgcolor=""
| April 14 || 2:00 pm || ESPN3 || at Kansas ||  || Hoglund Ballpark • Lawrence, KS ||  ||  ||  ||  ||  ||  ||  || 
|- align="center" bgcolor=""
| April 15 || 1:00 pm || ESPN3 || at Kansas ||  || Hoglund Ballpark • Lawrence, KS ||  ||  ||  ||  ||  ||  ||  || 
|- align="center" bgcolor=""
| April 17 || 6:30 pm || || * ||  || Lupton Stadium • Fort Worth, TX ||  ||  ||  ||  ||  ||  || – || 
|- align="center" bgcolor=""
| April 18 || 6:30 pm || || at Texas–Arlington* ||  || Clay Gould Ballpark • Arlington, TX ||  ||  ||  ||  ||  ||  || – || 
|- align="center" bgcolor=""
| April 20|| 6:35 pm || || at  ||  || Baylor Ballpark • Waco, TX ||  ||  ||  ||  ||  ||  ||  || 
|- align="center" bgcolor=""
| April 21 || 3:05 pm || || at Baylor ||  || Baylor Ballpark • Waco, TX ||  ||  ||  ||  ||  ||  ||  || 
|- align="center" bgcolor=""
| April 22 || 1:05 pm || FSSW+ || at Baylor ||  || Baylor Ballpark • Waco, TX ||  ||  ||  ||  ||  ||  ||  || 
|- align="center" bgcolor=""
| April 24 || 6:30 pm || || * ||  || Lupton Stadium • Fort Worth, TX ||  ||  ||  ||  ||  ||  || – || 
|- align="center" bgcolor=""
| April 27 || 8:00 pm || FS1 || Texas Tech ||  || Lupton Stadium • Fort Worth, TX ||  ||  ||  ||  ||  ||  ||  || 
|- align="center" bgcolor=""
| April 28 || 7:00 pm || ESPNU || Texas Tech ||  || Lupton Stadium • Fort Worth, TX ||  ||  ||  ||  ||  ||  ||  || 
|- align="center" bgcolor=""
| April 29 || 1:00 pm || ESPNU || Texas Tech ||  || Lupton Stadium • Fort Worth, TX ||  ||  ||  ||  ||  ||  ||  || 
|-

|- align="center" bgcolor=""
| May 1 || 6:30 pm || || at Abilene Christian* ||  || Crutcher Scott Field • Abilene, TX ||  ||  ||  ||  ||  ||  || – || 
|- align="center" bgcolor=""
| May 4 || 6:30 pm || || * ||  || Lupton Stadium • Fort Worth, TX ||  ||  ||  ||  ||  ||  || – || 
|- align="center" bgcolor=""
| May 5 || 4:00 pm || || Lamar* ||  || Lupton Stadium • Fort Worth, TX ||  ||  ||  ||  ||  ||  || – || 
|- align="center" bgcolor=""
| May 6 || 1:00 pm || FSSW+ || Lamar* ||  || Lupton Stadium • Fort Worth, TX ||  ||  ||  ||  ||  ||  || – || 
|- align="center" bgcolor=""
| May 11 || 6:30 pm || ||  ||  || Lupton Stadium • Fort Worth, TX ||  ||  ||  ||  ||  ||  ||  || 
|- align="center" bgcolor=""
| May 12 || 4:00 pm || FSSW || West Virginia ||  || Lupton Stadium • Fort Worth, TX ||  ||  ||  ||  ||  ||  ||  || 
|- align="center" bgcolor=""
| May 13 || 1:00 pm || || West Virginia ||  || Lupton Stadium • Fort Worth, TX ||  ||  ||  ||  ||  ||  ||  || 
|- align="center" bgcolor=""
| May 15 || 6:30 pm || || at Stephen F. Austin* ||  || Jaycees Field • Nacogdoches, TX ||  ||  ||  ||  ||  ||  || – || 
|- align="center" bgcolor=""
| May 17 || 6:30 pm || FS1 || at Texas ||  || UFCU Disch-Falk Field • Austin, TX ||  ||  ||  ||  ||  ||  ||  || 
|- align="center" bgcolor=""
| May 18 || 6:30 pm || LHN || at Texas ||  || UFCU Disch-Falk Field • Austin, TX ||  ||  ||  ||  ||  ||  ||  || 
|- align="center" bgcolor=""
| May 19 || 2:30 pm || LHN || at Texas ||  || UFCU Disch-Falk Field • Austin, TX ||  ||  ||  ||  ||  ||  ||  ||
|-

|- 
! style="background:#4d1979;color:white;"| Postseason
|-

|- align="center" bgcolor=""
|  ||  ||  ||  ||  || Chickasaw Bricktown Ballpark • Oklahoma City, OK ||  ||  ||  ||  ||  ||  ||  || 
|- align="center" bgcolor=""
|  ||  ||  ||  ||  || Chickasaw Bricktown Ballpark • Oklahoma City, OK ||  ||  ||  ||  ||  ||  ||  || 
|-

|- align="center" bgcolor=""
|  ||  ||  ||  ||  ||  ||  ||  ||  ||  ||  ||  ||  || 
|- align="center" bgcolor=""
|  ||  ||  ||  ||  ||  ||  ||  ||  ||  ||  ||  ||  || 
|-

| style="font-size:88%" | Legend:       = Win       = Loss      Bold = TCU team member
|-
| style="font-size:88%" | "#" represents ranking. All rankings from Collegiate Baseball on the date of the contest."()" represents postseason seeding in the Big 12 Tournament or NCAA Regional, respectively.

Rankings

Awards and honors

See also
2018 Big 12 Conference baseball tournament
2018 NCAA Division I baseball season

References

TCU Horned Frogs
TCU Horned Frogs baseball seasons
TCU Horned Frogs baseball